George Hardie may refer to:

 George Hardie (artist) (born 1944), English artist involved with the graphic design company Hipgnosis
 George Hardie (politician) ( 1874–1937), Scottish Labour politician, MP for Springburn
 George Hardie (tennis) (born 1953), American tennis player
 George Hardie (footballer) (1873–?), English footballer

See also
 George Hardy (disambiguation)